The Rivers State Ministry of Works is a ministry of the Government of Rivers State concerned with providing socio-economic infrastructure in Rivers State, Nigeria. It is headquartered in the State Secretariat building in Port Harcourt.

Functions and responsibilities
Construct and rehabilitate urban road networks.
Construct rural road networks.
Maintain urban roads.
Control flood and erosion.

List of commissioners
David Briggs (1999–2003)
Felicity Okpete Ovai (2003–2006)
Julius Orumbo (2006–2007)
Dakuku Peterside (2007–2011)
Victor Giadom (2011-2015)
Kelvin Wachukwu (2015–2016)
Harrison B. Iheanyichukwu (2016–2017)
Dum Dekor (2017–present)

See also
Government of Rivers State
Government ministries of Rivers State

References

External links
Government of Rivers State

Works
Public works ministries
Works